Million Dollar Boy is the third solo studio album by the Canadian rapper K.Maro. The album was released in Europe on 21 October, 2005. There were three singles released from that album.

Track listing
"K.M.A.R.O"  
"Les frères existent encore"  
"Histoires de luv" feat. Shy'm
"K.Pone. Inc." 
"Gangsta Party" 
"Million Dollar Boy" 
"Nice And Slow" feat. Shy'm   
"Juss Shake" 
"Dirty" 
"Strip Club" 
"Nouveau Millenaire" 
"The Greatest"  feat. Divin 
"Simple Vie"

Singles
"Histoires de luv"
"Les frères existent encore"
"Gangsta Party"

Certifications

References

External links
 K'Maro - Million Dollar Boy

2005 albums
K.Maro albums
French-language albums